The London International Youth Science Forum is a residential science forum. Each year around 500 students aged 16–21 years old attend from both in the United Kingdom and overseas. The forum is based in London. Students interact with "experts at the top of their fields" in a  programme of lectures, with access to research centers, scientific laboratories, and educational institutions including Cambridge and Oxford universities.

The conference also emphasises inter-cultural communication through various social events, and in 2016 LIYSF was granted UNESCO patronage.

History
The idea of a science forum was most evidently considered after World War II, when this idea was realized in the form of student exchanges between different schools and communities in the United Kingdom, the Netherlands, Denmark, and Czechoslovakia. In 1959, writing that "out of like interests the strongest interests grow", Philip Green initiated a coordinated programme housing all participants at the University of London.

In the next decades, the conference expanded across the globe, starting from the United States of America to Eastern Asian countries. The initial goal was to "put science into perspective and to encourage those attending to be aware of the needs of the world and what was happening in disciplines other than the one they were studying".

Speakers at LIYSF include well-known scientists and policymakers.

Reception
The Forum has received acknowledgement from world leaders. David Cameron, former Prime Minister, described LIYSF as "a fantastic opportunity for young scientists from all over the world to come together... and engage in a program designed to educate, stimulate and inspire". The Director-General of the United Nations Educational, Scientific and Cultural Organization, Irina Bokova, notes that LIYSF exhibits "a commendable understanding of how science and culture go hand in hand, while sharing knowledge and experiences".

Support
Support is primarily provided by, amongst other organizations and groups, The European Commission, the British Council, and Education UK and the GREAT Campaign.

See also
 Asian Science Camp
 National Science Camp (India)
 National Youth Science Forum (Australia)
 Stockholm International Youth Science Seminar (SIYSS)

References

External links

Youth science
Science and technology in London
Youth organisations based in London
1959 establishments in England